The N7 is a Bangladeshi national highway connecting the Daulatdia Ferry Terminal, on the south bank of the Padma River near the Bangladeshi capital Dhaka, with the Port of Mongla in Bagerhat District. It serves some of the largest cities and towns in southwestern Bangladesh, including Faridpur, Magura, Jhenaidah, Jessore, and Khulna. The highway is known along various stretches as the Dhaka–Khulna Highway, the Jessore-Khulna Highway, and the Khulna-Mongla Highway.

Southwestern Bangladesh is laced with numerous rivers and streams, which results in N7 having the most bridges and culverts of any highway in the national system. It is limited to two lanes of traffic for most of its length.

Route description
The northern terminus of N7 is the Daulatdia Ferry Terminal, on the south bank of the Padma River. Long delays waiting to cross the river fuel the prostitution that makes Daulatdia the largest brothel in Bangladesh, and one of the largest in the world.

Beginning at the ferry terminal, N7 goes southwest for 14 km before it turns southeast and parallels the river as far as the junction with N803 just west of Faridpur. Skirting the city, the highway turns west to Magura where N702 splits off. N7 continues west from Magura to Jhenaidah, a stretch that is the second deadliest in the national highway network. It makes a three-quarters loop around the north and west sides of Jhenaidah, with N704 splitting off at Arappur and N703 going into the centre of the city, before N7 turns south to Jessore. The segment between Jhenaidah and Jessore is the busiest one on the highway. At Palbari, just north of Jessore, N708 branches off. In Jessore N7 is rejoined by N702, and N706 splits off. Just south of Jessore, N707 merges at Murali.

N7 continues southeast, passing through Khulna, the largest city on the highway and the administrative headquarters of Khulna Division. N709 is a bypass that takes off from Phultala, north of Khulna, and rejoins south of the city at Kudir Battala, crossing the Rupsha River by bridge instead of, as the main road does, by ferry. The southern terminus of N7 is Bangladesh's second busiest seaport, the Port of Mongla, at the junction of the Mongla and Pasur Rivers.

Junction list

References

AH1
National Highways in Bangladesh